Scott Waide (born 11 July 1977) is a New Zealand former cricketer. He played three first-class matches for Otago in 2001/02.

See also
 List of Otago representative cricketers

References

External links
 

1977 births
Living people
New Zealand cricketers
Otago cricketers
Cricketers from Dunedin